Fred DeStefano was a professional American football player who played running back for two seasons for the Chicago Cardinals. After retiring from football, he became a physician, and died in Houston, Texas in 1974 of multiple organ failure.

References

1900 births
1974 deaths
American football running backs
Chicago Cardinals players
Princeton Tigers football players
People from Coal City, Illinois
Players of American football from Illinois